Touchdown Jesus may refer to:
The Word of Life or Touchdown Jesus, a mural visible from Notre Dame Stadium, in Notre Dame, Indiana.
King of Kings (statue) or Touchdown Jesus, a statue that was on the east side of Interstate 75 near Monroe, Ohio.
"Touchdown Jesus", a song from Tim McGraw's Emotional Traffic album